Ji Jun (born 27 December 1985) is a Chinese footballer.

Club career
Ji Jun would be a graduate of the Shanghai Zhabei Football Academy in 2003, however he failed to be selected for the Shanghai National Games team, so he joined the newly established Shanghai Hengyuan Football Club in the third tier. The club would relocate to Nanchang, Jiangxi and rename themselves Nanchang Hengyuan as well as going on to win the division title at the end of the 2005 league season. Initially starting as a midfielder, Ji would be moved as a forward and go on to score six goals within the 2009 China League One season as the team came runners-up within the division and gain promotion to the top tier for the first time in their history.

Within the top tier of Chinese football, Ji would struggle to gain much game time and actively paid for his own flight to pursue a move to Indonesia before joining Meizhou Hakka in the third tier. The move would see a revival in his  career and he would win the 2015 China League Two division title with them and promotion to the second tier. Ji decided to rejoin his previous club at the start of the 2016 league season, Nanchang Hengyuan who had returned to Shanghai and renamed themselves Shanghai Shenxin F.C. several seasons earlier. On 14 February 2018, Ji joined third tier club Nantong Zhiyun.

Career statistics

Notes

Honours

Club
Nanchang Hengyuan 
 China League Two: 2005

Meizhou Hakka  
 China League Two: 2015

References

External links

1985 births
Living people
Chinese footballers
Association football forwards
Chinese Super League players
China League One players
China League Two players
Shanghai Shenxin F.C. players
Meizhou Hakka F.C. players
Nantong Zhiyun F.C. players